Mountain Pine is a city in Garland County, Arkansas, United States. It is part of the Hot Springs Metropolitan Statistical Area. The population was 770 at the 2010 United States Census. It is located immediately southeast of Lake Ouachita below the Blakely Mountain Dam. The city consists of five defined neighborhoods, Pinewood (north), South Mountain Pine, a business district (city hall, bank, post office, store), Cozy Acres (southwest) and Mountain View/Timberland area.

Mountain Pine was founded as a company town in the late 1920s by Dierks Lumber and Coal Company, which operated a vast lumber mill on the town's east side. The mill was closed in 2006 by then-owners Weyerhaeuser, and later dismantled.

Geography
Mountain Pine is located near the center of Garland County at  (34.572375, -93.172806).

Climate
The climate in this area is characterized by hot, humid summers and generally mild to cool winters. According to the Köppen Climate Classification system, Mountain Pine has a humid subtropical climate, abbreviated "Cfa" on climate maps.

Demographics

2020 census

As of the 2020 United States census, there were 585 people, 284 households, and 147 families residing in the city.

2000 census
As of the census of 2000, there were 772 people, 308 households, and 221 families residing in the city. The racial makeup of the city was 71.37% White, 23.45% Black or African American, 1.94% Native American, 0.65% Asian, 0.26% from other races, and 2.33% from two or more races.  0.39% of the population were Hispanic or Latino of any race.

There were 308 households, out of which 33.4% had children under the age of 18 living with them, 44.5% were married couples living together, 20.1% had a female householder with no husband present, and 28.2% were non-families. 26.9% of all households were made up of individuals, and 11.7% had someone living alone who was 65 years of age or older.  The average household size was 2.51 and the average family size was 2.99.

In the city, the population was spread out, with 28.9% under the age of 18, 9.2% from 18 to 24, 27.1% from 25 to 44, 21.9% from 45 to 64, and 13.0% who were 65 years of age or older.  The median age was 34 years. For every 100 females, there were 91.6 males.  For every 100 females age 18 and over, there were 87.4 males.

The median income for a household in the city was $20,804, and the median income for a family was $22,344. Males had a median income of $22,206 versus $16,058 for females. About 39.8% of families were below the poverty level.

Education

Ełementary and secondary education 
Public education for early childhood, elementary and secondary school students is provided by:

 Mountain Pine School District, which leads to graduation from Mountain Pine High School

Infrastructure

Transportation
Mountain Pine is connected by Arkansas Highway 192, which connects to Arkansas Highway 7 between Hot Springs Village and Jessieville, and by Arkansas Highway 227, which connects to U.S. Route 270 in Hot Springs.

Notable person
Bobby Bones was born in Mountain Pine. He hosts a Nashville morning radio show called The Bobby Bones Show.

References

Cities in Arkansas
Cities in Garland County, Arkansas